The Socialist Workers Party (Spanish: Partido Socialista de los Trabajadores, PST) was a Panamanian Trotskyist political party.

The PST was accorded legal recognition as a party in September 1983. It sought, unsuccessfully, to enlist the support of the People’s Party of Panama in an electoral front against "Yankee imperialism" in 1984.

The PRT vehemently opposed the Manuel Noriega-led National Democratic Union coalition in 1984 and ran its own candidate, Ricardo Barría, for president.
In 1990, after the overthrow and arrest of Manuel Noriega, the PST joined the United Patriotric Front to protest the U.S. intervention.

The PST was officially deregistered in November 1984.

See also
:Category:Socialist Workers Party (Panama) politicians

References

1983 establishments in Panama
1984 disestablishments in Panama
Communist parties in Panama
Defunct communist parties
Defunct political parties in Panama
Political parties disestablished in 1984
Political parties established in 1983
Trotskyist organizations in North America